This is a list of Equipment of the Indonesian Army currently in service. The Indonesian Army (Indonesian: Tentara Nasional Indonesia-Angkatan Darat, TNI–AD), the land component of the Indonesian National Armed Forces, has an estimated strength of 483,000 active personnel, 400,000 reserve personnel, 598 tanks (including tanks from the Indonesian Navy's Marine Corps), and 1,539 armored vehicles.

Ground vehicle

Artillery

Aircraft

Watercraft

Aircraft Weaponry

Firearms

Historical equipment

Nambu Pistol
Luger Pistol
M1 Garand
Lee–Enfield
Geweer M. 95
Mosin-Nagant
Karabiner 98k
Type 38 rifle
Type 99 rifle
vz. 52 rifle
M1 Carbine
M14 Rifle
SKS
M1A1 Thompson
M3 Submachine Gun
Madsen M-50
MP-40
Sten Gun
Type 100 submachine gun
MP-18
PPSh-41
M1918 BAR
Type 96 light machine gun
Type 99 light machine gun
Bren light machine gun
Madsen machine gun
Degtyaryov machine gun
Type 24
Vickers machine gun
Universal Carrier
Marmon-Herrington Armoured Car
Humber Armoured Car
Humber Scout Car
Ford Lynx
Panhard EBR
BRDM-1
BTR-152
BTR-50
PT-76
M3 Stuart
M4 Sherman
Type 97 Te-Ke
Type 97 Chi-Ha
Bazooka
ENTAC
SS.11
M67
M40A1
M-56
Ordnance QF 25-pounder
OTO Melara Mod 56
RM-51
SURA-D
Rapier

Procurement
The Indonesian Army was reportedly interested in purchasing 4 Boeing CH-47 Chinook transport helicopter and 17 Sikorsky UH-60 Black Hawk utility helicopter

On 6 July 2020, the US State Department announced it had approved a possible sale to Indonesia of 8 Bell Boeing V-22 Osprey Block C aircraft and related equipment for an estimated cost of up to $2 billion. The US Defense Security Cooperation Agency notified Congress of the possible sale. There were also talks of procuring MQ-1C or MQ-9 drones for the TNI-AD.

On 16 July 2020 Defense Minister Prabowo Subianto said the Defense Ministry planned to purchase up to 3,000 Maung from Pindad and had made an initial order of 500 units. Some of the production was hoped to be completed by October 2020 in time for Indonesian National Armed Forces Day. Prabowo also ordered 25,000 long and short barreled weapons from Pindad. The Defense Ministry also said it was purchasing 4 billion units of ammunition from Pindad in a contract worth Rp19 trillion and to be completed by 2023.

See also
 List of equipment of the Indonesian Navy
 List of equipment of the Indonesian Air Force
 List of equipment of the Indonesian National Police
 List of aircraft of the Indonesian National Armed Forces

References

Sources
 
 
 

Indonesian Army
Indonesian Army
Military equipment of Indonesia
Equipment